The Park Record is a twice-weekly newspaper published in Park City, Utah. It was founded in 1880 as the Park Mining Record, edited by James Shupback. After two editorial changes, Sam Raddon, formerly with the Salt Lake Tribune, had taken over editor- and ownership, and the newspaper began to establish itself as an "outspoken and critical" paper--"anti-everything, including anti-Mormon, anti-Chinese, and anti-Indian." Raddon added several small, failing papers to the Record, which he led for half a decade.

The Park Record is now controlled by Swift Communications.

References

External links

Newspapers published in Utah
Publications established in 1880